Thomas Brodrick (died 1 January 1769) was an officer of the Royal Navy during the War of the Austrian Succession, the War of Jenkins' Ear and the Seven Years' War.

Life
Brodrick entered the navy about 1723. In recompense for his brilliant conduct Vernon promoted him to the command of the fireship , in which he in 1741 took part in the Battle of Cartagena de Indias. On 25 March 1741 he was "posted" (i.e. made Post Captain) into the frigate , and continued actively employed during the rest of that campaign, and afterwards in the expedition to Cuba. After other service he returned to England in 1743, and early in the following year was appointed to the 60-gun .

In May 1756 Brodrick was sent out to the Mediterranean in command of reinforcements for Admiral John Byng, whom he joined at Gibraltar just before the admiral was ordered home under arrest. He had meantime been advanced on 4 June to the rank of Rear admiral, in which rank he served under Sir Edward Hawke until towards the close of the year, when the fleet returned home. Early in 1758 Brodrick was appointed as second in command in the Mediterranean, with his flag on board the 90-gun HMS Prince George. On 13 April, being then off Ushant, the Prince George caught fire, and out of a complement of nearly 800, some 250 only were saved; the Rear admiral himself was picked up, stark naked, by a merchant-ship's boat, after he had been swimming for about an hour.

On the following 14 February (1759) he was promoted to the rank of Vice admiral, and was shortly afterwards superseded by Admiral Edward Boscawen, under whom he commanded during the blockade of Toulon, and in the action of 18–19 August, culminating in the burning or capture of the French ships in Lagos Bay. When Boscawen returned to England, Brodrick blockaded the French ships at Cadiz so closely, that even the friendly Spaniards could not resist making them the subject of insolent ridicule. They are said to have stuck up a notice in some such terms as "For sale, eight French men-of-war. For particulars apply to Vice-admiral Brodrick". The French ships did not stir out till the passage was cleared for them by a gale of wind, which compelled the blockading squadron to put into Gibraltar. Brodrick then returned to England. He had no further employment, and died 1 January 1769 of cancer in the face.

References

1769 deaths
Royal Navy vice admirals
Deaths from cancer in England
Royal Navy personnel of the War of the Austrian Succession
Royal Navy personnel of the Seven Years' War
Year of birth unknown